Giulio Leonardo Cantoni (29 September 1915 – 25 July 2005) was the director of the United States' National Institutes of Health's  Laboratory of Cellular Pharmacology, later renamed the Laboratory of General and Comparative Biochemistry.

Early life 
Cantoni grew up in Italy and got a medical degree from the University of Milan in 1938. Shortly after the fascists abolished the parliament, and introduced anti-Semitic laws, Cantoni, who was Jewish, fled with his family first to England. As Cantoni was boarding a ship heading for the America, World War II broke out, and as an Italian citizen he was interned in England and later in Canada. Eventually he was released and allowed to go to the United States in July 1941.

Author
After the war, Cantoni wrote a book about his journey during World War II called From Milano to New York; By Way of Hell: Fascism and the Odyssey of a Young Italian Jew.

Scientific career 
Cantoni got a job at University of Michigan's medical school, where he worked until he became an assistant professor of pharmacology at Long Island College of Medicine in 1945. In 1948 he moved to the American Cancer Society, and after two years he moved again to Western Reserve University. In 1954 he started the National Institutes of Health's Laboratory of Cellular Pharmacology at the National Institute of Mental Health, where he remained as the director until his retirement in 1994.  In 1983 he joined the United States National Academy of Sciences.

Research
Cantoni discovered the biological mechanism of methylation using S-adenosylmethionine.

Home life
Giulio Cantoni married Gabriella Cantoni and they had two daughters named Allegra and Serena.  Before Cantoni died, he had four grand children, Ariella, Brendan, Ethan and Elliot.

References
  Giulio Cantoni; NIH lab chief, biochemistry researcher; 89 THE WASHINGTON POST August 25, 2005

   https://www.amazon.com/From-Milano-New-York-Hell/dp/059500475X/ref=sr_1_1?ie=UTF8&qid=1332113187&sr=8-1

Cantoni, Giulio L.
1915 births
2005 deaths
Members of the United States National Academy of Sciences
Italian pharmacologists
20th-century Italian Jews
Italian emigrants to the United States